Groningen is a city in the Netherlands.

Groningen may also refer to:

Places
Groningen (province), a province of the Netherlands of which Groningen is the capital city
Lordship of Groningen, the name under which the province was ruled by the Habsburg between 1536 and 1594
Groningen gas field, a natural gas field in province of Groningen
Groningen, Suriname, a town in the Saramacca District, Suriname
Groningen, Minnesota, an unincorporated community in Minnesota, United States
Gröningen, a town in Saxony-Anhalt, Germany
Grøningen, a Norwegian lake

Other uses
Groningen (cattle), a breed of dairy cattle
Gronings dialect, the Dutch language dialect spoken in Groningen
FC Groningen, the football club from Groningen, the Netherlands
HNLMS Groningen, several ships of the Dutch navy
University of Groningen, Netherlands

See also